The Men's 5000 metres at the 2008 Summer Olympics took place on 20 and 23 August at the Beijing National Stadium.

The qualifying standards were 13:21.50 (A standard) and 13:28.00 (B standard).

Records 
Prior to this competition, the existing world record was:

Results

Heat 1 

Qualification: First 4 in each heat(Q) and the next 3 fastest(q) advance to the Final.

To sort this table by heat, athlete, or any other column, click on the  icon next to the column title.

Heat 2

Heat 3

Final 

23 August 2008 - 20:10

Splits

References 

Athletics at the 2008 Summer Olympics
5000 metres at the Olympics
Men's events at the 2008 Summer Olympics